Branislav Stojanović (born 9 September 1973) is a Serbian sprinter. He competed in the men's 4 × 400 metres relay at the 2000 Summer Olympics, representing Yugoslavia.

References

1973 births
Living people
Athletes (track and field) at the 2000 Summer Olympics
Serbian male sprinters
Yugoslav male sprinters
Olympic athletes of Yugoslavia
Athletes (track and field) at the 1997 Mediterranean Games
Place of birth missing (living people)
Mediterranean Games competitors for Serbia and Montenegro